Lawrence Hugh Landweber is  John P. Morgridge Professor Emeritus of computer science at the University of Wisconsin–Madison.

He received his bachelor's degree  in 1963 at Brooklyn College and his Ph.D. at Purdue University in 1967. His doctoral thesis was "A design algorithm for sequential machines and definability in monadic second-order arithmetic."

He is best known for founding the CSNET project in 1979, which later developed into NSFNET. He is credited with having made the fundamental decision to use the TCP/IP protocol.

Publications
He is co-author of  Brainerd, Walter S., and Lawrence H. Landweber. Theory of Computation. New York: Wiley, 1974. .

Awards
President, Internet Society  
Fellow, ACM.
Honorary Doctor of Humane Letters, Brooklyn College, 2009  
IEEE Award on International Communication, 2005
Member of the board of  Internet2 (2000–2008)
Jonathan B. Postel Service Award of the Internet Society, for CSNET, 2009
In 2012, Landweber was inducted into the Internet Hall of Fame by the Internet Society.

References

External links
 http://pages.cs.wisc.edu/~lhl/ Official web page at Wisconsin

Brooklyn College alumni
Purdue University alumni
University of Wisconsin–Madison faculty
Writers from Wisconsin
Living people
Internet pioneers
Fellows of the Association for Computing Machinery
Year of birth missing (living people)